Lex is a given name. It can refer to a shortened version of Alexander or Alexis.

People with the name
Lex Banning (1921–1965), Australian lyric poet
Lex Barker (1919–1973), American actor
Lex Davison (1923–1965), Australian racing driver
Lex van Delden (1919–1988), Dutch composer
Lex van der Eb (born 1934), Dutch molecular biologist and virologist
Lex Frieden (born 1949), American disability activist and professor
Lex Gigeroff (1962–2011), Canadian television writer and actor best known as co-creator of the science fiction series Lexx  
Lex Goudsmit (1913–1999), Dutch actor
Lex Greensill (born 1976), Australian businessman best known for founding Greensill Capital and the subsequent Greensill scandal
Robert A. Green (1892–1973), U.S. Representative from Florida
Lex Humphries (1936–1994), jazz drummer
Lex Lang (born 1965), American voice actor
Lex Lasry (born 1948), Australian lawyer and a judge on the Supreme Court of Victoria
Lex Law, Scottish former footballer
Lex Luger (born 1958), ring name of American professional wrestler Lawrence Wendell "Larry" Pfohl
Lex Marinos (born 1949), Australian actor
Lex McLean (1908–1975), Scottish comedian
Lex Schoenmaker (born 1947), Dutch former football player and manager
Lex Shrapnel (born 1979), English actor
Lex Staley, half of the syndicated American radio morning team Lex and Terry
Lex Steele (born 1969, stage name of Clifton Britt), American pornographic actor
 Lex van den Berghe, contestant in the 2001 American television show Survivor: Africa
Lex Veldhuis (born 1983), Dutch professional poker player

Fictional characters
Lex Luthor, nemesis of Superman
Alexis "Lex" Murphy, in the Jurassic Park novel and film franchise
Lex, in the New Zealand / British TV series The Tribe (1999–2003), played by Caleb Ross
Lex, in the game Fire Emblem: Genealogy of the Holy War (1996)

See also
Lexx, a science fiction TV series and a spaceship/weapon in the series
LEXX (text editor)
Mr. Lexx, Jamaican dancehall artist Christopher Palmer (born 1974)

Hypocorisms
Dutch masculine given names